Caulolatilus is a genus of tilefishes native to the Pacific and Atlantic coasts of the Americas. This genus is regarded as the least specialised and the most basal of the tilefishes.

Species
There are currently 11 recognized species in this genus:
 Caulolatilus affinis T. N. Gill, 1865 (Bighead tilefish)
 Caulolatilus bermudensis Dooley, 1981 (Bermuda tilefish)
 Caulolatilus chrysops (Valenciennes, 1833) (Atlantic goldeneye tilefish)
 Caulolatilus cyanops Poey, 1866 (Blackline tilefish)
 Caulolatilus dooleyi Berry, 1978 (Bankslope tilefish)
 Caulolatilus guppyi Beebe & Tee-Van, 1937 (Reticulated tilefish)
 Caulolatilus hubbsi Dooley, 1978 (Hubbs' tilefish)
 Caulolatilus intermedius Howell-Rivero, 1936 (Gulf bareye tilefish)
 Caulolatilus microps Goode & T. H. Bean, 1878 (Grey tilefish)
 Caulolatilus princeps (Jenyns, 1840) (Ocean whitefish)
 Caulolatilus williamsi Dooley & Berry, 1977 (Yellowbar tilefish)

Studies have shown that C. hubbsi is not readily distinguishable from C. princeps and should be treated as a junior synonym of the latter taxon.

References

Malacanthidae